Amitabh Reza Chowdhury is a Bangladeshi filmmaker. In his career, he has directed nearly fifteen hundred (1500) television commercials (henceforth TVCs). Amitabh has also directed a few television films to critical acclaim. He founded the production house 'half stop down', which mainly produces TVCs. Amitabh's directorial debut in theatrical feature film is Aynabaji which was released on 30 September 2016.

Early life 
Chowdhury was born to a middle-class family in 1976. His hometown is Kishorganj, Bangladesh. He went to Pune, India to study economics. While there, he studied literature on his own to aid his dream about making films.

Career
After returning to Bangladesh, Chowdhury made a television film named Hawa Ghar (1999) under Maasranga Production which gained popularity. After Hawa Ghar he directed the first 20-episodes of the TV series Bondhon (2001-2002) under Maasranga Production. Following the success of Hawa Ghar and Bondhon, he received offers from agencies to make television commercials. He is now one of the leading directors of TVCs in Bangladesh. A number of his productions have been screened in other countries as well. He, his sister Mahjabin Reza and Md Assaduzzaman are owners of the production company "Half Stop Down". Under his production house he made more than 12 television films, followed by his first theatrical feature film. He has also worked as adjunct faculty in the Television, Film & Photography Department of the University of Dhaka.

Personal life  

Chowdhury married Bangladeshi actress Nowrin Jahan Khan Jenny in his early life, but the marriage did not last for long. After 4 years, they separated and Amitabh married Mim Rashid, the younger sister of singer Mithila and ex-sister-in-law of Tahsan. Reza and Mim divorced in 2017; Mim married popular actor Iresh Zaker in February 2018.

Filmography 
Chowdhury's debut film as a director was Aynabaji (2016). Starring Chanchal Chowdhury, Masuma Rahman Nabila and Partha Barua. The film was a major success in the box office, and it was screened in movie halls across the country for next few months. However, it was not profitable for the producer. His upcoming films include "Rickshaw Girl" and "Punorujjibon". Aynabaji was screened at Marché du Film at 69th annual Cannes Film Festival, where it scored well. Aynabaji has won the award of the best film at United States's 11th Seattle South Asian Film
Festival. His next film is Munshigiri, which will be released digitally by Chorki in 2021.

Films

TV and web series

Recognition and awards 
Chowdhury received a number of national and international awards for his work. He was awarded with the Meril-Prothom Alo Best Film Director Award in 2017. He also received the Best Film Award in Seattle South Asian Film Festival in 2016 for Aynabaji.

References 

Living people
People from Dhaka
Bangladeshi filmmakers
Best Director National Film Award (Bangladesh) winners
Year of birth missing (living people)
Best Film Directing Meril-Prothom Alo Critics Choice Award winners